Harry Harvey is a Unionist politician from Northern Ireland representing the Democratic Unionist Party (DUP). Harvey has been a Member of the Northern Ireland Assembly (MLA) for Strangford since 2019.

Born in Crossgar, Northern Ireland, Harvey is the son of politician Cecil Harvey.  He worked at Bells Crossgar Motors for twenty years.

At the 2014 Northern Ireland local elections, Harvey was elected to represent the Rowallane area on Newry and Mourne District Council, for the Democratic Unionist Party. In September 2019, he was co-opted to represent the Strangford constituency in the Northern Ireland Assembly, replacing Simon Hamilton.

References

Year of birth missing (living people)
Living people
Democratic Unionist Party councillors
Democratic Unionist Party MLAs
Northern Ireland MLAs 2017–2022
People from County Down
Northern Ireland MLAs 2022–2027